Andrew James "Jim" Blackett-Ord, CVO (1921 – 21 February 2012) was a British barrister and judge. During World War II he was held for two years as a prisoner of war.

Early life
He was educated at Eton College and New College, Oxford.

War Service

During World War II he was commissioned into the Scots Guards, where in 1943 he met and later became engaged to Rosemary Bovill.

In 1943 he was posted to North Africa, where he later recorded that at one point, he found himself having dinner in a tent alone with King George VI, principally because all of the officers in his regiment had already embarked for Italy. He rejoined the regiment after Anzio landings, where his battalion was routed by the German counterattack. He ordered the remaining men to surrender. His obituary recorded that this act "saved many of their lives, but left him with no glorious military record".

He then spent two years as a German prisoner of war.

Family

After the war, he returned home and married Rosemary. Together they had five children (one of whom died in infancy). In 1951 he inherited his wife's family estate at Helbeck, from the old Warcop family of Breeks, and then a year later in 1952, he inherited his ancestral family home of Whitfield Hall.

Law

Blackett-Ord made his living as a barrister, mainly in conveyancing. He practiced from chambers in London from 1946 to 1972. In 1972 he was appointed Vice-Chancellor of the County Palatine of Lancaster, and returned north to sit as a judge. He was the first person appointed to the post subsequent the Courts Act 1971 coming into force (previously the appointment of the Vice-Chancellor of the County Palatine was controlled by section 14 of the Administration of Justice Act 1881). In the end, he was the only judge after that date to hold the office independently; after he stepped down in 1987, the office has been held by a Justice of the High Court sitting in the Chancery Division.

In a break with tradition he was awarded the Commander of the Royal Victorian Order (CVO) in the 1988 New Year Honours instead of the traditional knighthood when he retired.

Church

Blackett-Ord also served as churchman, a churchwarden and chancellor of Newcastle diocese.

References

20th-century English judges
1921 births
2012 deaths
People educated at Eton College
Alumni of New College, Oxford
British World War II prisoners of war
Commanders of the Royal Victorian Order
British Army personnel of World War II
Scots Guards officers
World War II prisoners of war held by Germany